Hose barbs are cylindrical pieces or parts for attaching and securing of hoses (tubing). The barb-like rings on the cylindrical piece allow for an easy push-connection of flexible-plastic or rubber tubing that is not so easily disconnected. Hose barbs are used in machine perfusion and chemistry laboratory equipment. Hose barb fittings are small curved, bent or T-shaped pipes, hoses or tubes with hose barbs on at least one side used to join two or more pieces of piping (hosing, tubing) together. Hose barbs are commonly used in the agriculture industry to connect anhydrous ammonia (NH3) hoses.

See also
 Hose coupling
 Piping and plumbing fitting

References

External links
 Vacuum Hose Barb Fittings

 

Laboratory equipment